Cantonese changed tones (also called pinjam) occur when a word's tone becomes a different tone due to a particular context or meaning. A "changed" tone is the tone of the word when it is read in a particular lexical or grammatical context, while the base (or underlying) tone is usually the tone of the word when read in citation. It is thus distinct from tone sandhi, which are automatic modifications of tone created by their phonetic environment, without regard to meaning. In its most common form, it occurs on the final syllable of either a compound word, a reduplicated word, or certain vocative examples, especially in direct address to people such as family members. There are a limited set of semantic domains where changed tone occurs, generally associated with small things, familiarity, food and disease. 

A changed tone usually takes the form of a non-high level, non-mid rising tone (i.e. tones 3, 4, 5, and 6 in Jyutping and Yale; see Cantonese phonology for further information on the tones in Cantonese) transforming into a mid-rising tone (tone 2); for some speakers, this changed tone is slightly lower than the citation mid-rising tone. For speakers with the high falling tone, this may also become the high level tone via the same process.  In many speakers, another form of a changed tone used in specific vocatives that may also result in a high level tone (tone 1), rather than in a mid-level tone.

Taishanese also exhibits changed tones. It is realized in some cases as an additional high floating tone to end of the mid level, low level, mid falling and low falling tones; this results in new contours for Taishanese, namely mid rising, low rising, mid dipping and low dipping respectively. The final pitch of these changed tones may be even higher in pitch than the citation high level tone. Another changed tone occurs where the expected tone is replaced by the low falling tone. These two are combined in certain cases, with the result that the expected tone is replaced by the low dipping tone, such as the change of the verb 刷 /tʃat˧/ "to brush" into the noun 刷 /tʃat˨˩˥/ "a brush".

The use of a high rising tone in marking changed tone in many Yue varieties of Chinese implies one possible origin in diminutive morphemes, much in the same way that erhua functions in Standard Mandarin and in the Beijing dialect. In Cantonese, several diminutive morphemes have been proposed as the original one, among them 兒 /jiː˥/ "son" (in its high level tone form) and 子 /t͡siː˧˥/ "child". Thus the changed tone is the relic of this contraction of the main syllable with this diminutive.

Notes

References
 
 

Phonology